State Of Rest (foaled 11 April 2018) is a retired Irish-bred and trained Thoroughbred racehorse. He was one of leading three-year-olds of 2021 winning Australia's premier G1 W. S. Cox Plate and Grade I Saratoga Derby Invitational Stakes in the United States. In 2022 he added further Group 1 wins, taking the Prix Ganay in France and the Prince of Wales's Stakes in England.

Background

State Of Rest is a bay colt, out of the Quiet American unraced mare Repose, was bred in Ireland by Tinnakill Bloodstock. He was sired by Starpangledbanner who was a champion sprinter in Australia before relocating to Europe where he won the Golden Jubilee Stakes and July Cup in 2010 and took the Cartier Champion Sprinter award. As a breeding stallion he had fertility problems, but sired other good horses including The Wow Signal, Millisle, Home of the Brave (John of Gaunt Stakes) and Anthem Alexander (Queen Mary Stakes).

In 2018 the colt was initially bought for 45,000 guineas by Diamond Bloodstock from Tinnakill House's consignment at the Tattersalls December Foal Sale. In 2019 Joseph O'Brien and Aidan O'Ryan purchased him for 60,000 guineas from Whatton Manor Stud's consignment to the Tattersalls October Yearling Sale.

Currently he is owned by Teme Valley.

Racing career

2020: two-year-old season

State Of Rest began his career with a win on 15 June 2020 in a Maiden event at Fairyhouse Racecourse over six furlongs running against 13 other runners, starting at 6/1 and defeating the favourite Giorgio Vasari by  length in a time of 1:13.75. The victory would be the only win during his juvenile season.

In his five other starts during the season his best effort was a second as the 7/4 favourite at his next start at Leopardstown. State Of Rest ran in three group events finishing third in the Group 2 Champagne Stakes at Doncaster and was fifth in the Group 1 Vertem Futurity Trophy in his last race of the year.

2021: three-year-old season

After a spell of eight months, State Of Rest first competitive race was at The Curragh on 26 June 2021 finished third at odds of 13/2 in the Listed Celebration Stakes over one mile finishing well to be beaten only about a  length on a good to firm track.

State Of Rest was sent to the United States and in his next start to run in the second leg of the rich NYRA Turf Trinity, the Grade I US$1 million Saratoga Derby Invitational Stakes over the  miles distance at Saratoga Race Course held 7 August 2021. Starting at the odds of 21/1 State of Rest was shuffled back to mid-pace, but US Hall of Fame jockey John Velazquez got him settled and saved ground down the backstretch. Entering the stretch with the leaders starting to tire out, Velazquez positioned State of Rest out toward the center of the track. After racing together briefly with Soldier Rising who was making a quick move up the rail, State of Rest managed to push clear, winning on the firm turf in 1:53.35 by one length. Trainer O'Brien was pleased commenting, "It's a pleasure to be here (in the US) and to have a horse that runs well here".

In September, State Of Rest was airlifted to Australia and was entered in the country's premier Weight for Age, the AU$5,000,000 Group I MVRC Ladbrokes Cox Plate. State Of Rest prepared for the event while on quarantine at Werribee Racetrack at Werribee. Prior to the start of the event, one of the favourites, Zaaki (GB) was scratched. The event was held 23 October 2021. In the running of the event jockey John Allen positioned State Of Rest unhurriedly near the rear of the field early. While approaching the straight Allen managed to guide State Of Rest near the rails and in the straight was able to hold off Caulfield Guineas winner Anamoe at the finishing line by a short head. However, the decision was not clear as Anamoe's jockey Craig Williams lodged a protest for interference in the straight. The protest was dismissed after a lengthy review by the stewards. The trainer Joseph O'Brien follows in his father's footsteps after his training victory in this event in 2014 with Adelaide (IRE). The trainer praised the owners, the manager Richard Ryan and Jim Coburn and also Mark Power and MJ Doran who travelled with horse and looked after State Of Rest for several weeks in preparation for the event. State Of Rest was to be nominated for the Group I VRC LKS MacKinnon Stakes but trainer Joseph O'Brien withdrew the horse opting to send him back to Ireland and the paddock for a spell.

2022: four-year-old season
State Of Rest began his third campaign with a trip to France to contest the Group 1 Prix Ganay over 2100 metres at Longchamp Racecourse on 1 May when he was ridden by Shane Crosse and went of the fourth choice in the betting behind Skalleti, Sealiway and Mare Australis. He raced fourth of the six runners before making steady progress in the straight, taking the lead 200 metres from the finish and winning by three quarters of a length from the outsider Pretty Tiger. O'Brien commented "The race didn’t set up perfectly for him and he managed it very well... He has a very good constitution, it’s not every horse you could campaign the way this lad has been campaigned. I think it’s a testament to the horse’s mind, his versatility and his constitution to travel as much as he has and keep performing.”

Three weeks after his win in France, State Of Rest started 2/1 joint favourite for the Tattersalls Gold Cup at the Curragh. He raced in mid division before finishing strongly to take third place behind Alenquer and High Definition beaten a neck and the same by the first two. The Racing Post commented that Crosse had given the colt "too much to do". 

The Group 1 Prince of Wales's Stakes over ten furlongs on good to firm ground on 15 June attracted a small but select field with the five contenders being State Of Rest, Bay Bridge, Shahryar, Lord North and Grand Glory. Starting the 5/1 third choice in the betting, State Of Rest took the lead from the start and set a steady pace before accelerating approaching the last quarter mile and kept on well in the closing stages to win by a length from Bay Bridge. After the race Joseph O'Brien said “He’s a very tough horse and he’s a very hard horse to go past. We knew he’d be fighting hard at the line. Shane executed it perfectly... I was quite relaxed watching the race because it was going how I hoped it would. It’s not very often that happens in racing. I think it was probably a career best but he had been training very well."

On 14 August connections of State Of Rest entered him in the Group 1 Prix du Haras de Fresnay-le-Buffard Jacques le Marois at Deauville over the 1600-metre distance. Starting at odds slightly over 13/2 State Of Rest was up close in the early stages of the event but with 600 meters to run he had dropped out to the tail of the field. 

In late August 2022, State Of Rest was retired from racing after an MRI scan conducted by Racing Victoria found an issue. State Of Rest was being aimed to return back to Australia to defend his Cox Plate crown at the Moonee Valley in October.

Statistics

Legend:

 

Notes:

An (*) asterisk after the odds means State Of Rest was the post-time favourite.

Pedigree

References

2018 racehorse births
Racehorses bred in Ireland
Racehorses trained in Ireland
Thoroughbred family 4-k
American Grade 1 Stakes winners